The Changsha Church Christianity is a 20th-century Chinese traditional architecture church. It is located in the Xiangchun Street, Kaifu District of Changsha, Hunan, China.

History
It was built in 1902 by the London Missionary Society, then its management by the Presbyterian Church in the United States of America in 1912, and was destroyed by the war. It was rebuilt in 1917.

In 1947, the Hunan Chinese Independent Christian Church was founded in here.

In 1966, the Cultural Revolution was launched by Mao Zedong, then the church closed and became a warehouse. It again opened to pilgrim in 1980.

In May 2002, it was listed as a "Historical and Cultural Sites Protected at the Provincial Level" by the Hunan government.

List of bishops

References

External links
 

Churches in Changsha
1902 establishments in China
Churches completed in 1902
Tourist attractions in Changsha
Protestant churches in China